The Campeonato Baiano Third Division is the third tier of football league of the state of Bahia, Brazil.

List of champions

Titles by team

Teams in bold stills active.

By city

References

  
Baiano